The 2300 class are a class of diesel locomotives rebuilt by Queensland Rail's Redbank Railway Workshops between 1997 and 2002.

History
The 2300 class are former 1550 and 2400, 2450 and 2470 class locomotives that were rebuilt between 1997 and 2002. Nineteen 1550 class locomotives (1550-1561, 1563-1566 and 1568-1570) were rebuilt as 2301-2315 and 2320-2323. Eighteen 2400 class locomotives (2400-2409 and 2416-2423) were rebuilt as 2330-2339 and 2346-2353. All seventeen remaining 2450 class locomotives (2450-2466) were rebuilt as 2355-2366 and 2370-2374. Six 2470 class locomotives (2501-2506) were rebuilt as 2387-2392.

The rebuilds included new cabs, Dash 2 electronics and the replacement of the roots blower supercharger with a turbocharger. In 2007, seven (2356, 2349, 2361, 2370, 2372, 2373 and 2374) were allocated to Queensland Rail's Australian Railroad Group subsidiary and transferred to Western Australia where they were re-numbered as DFZ2401-DFZ2407. Currently only DFZ2405 is operational with all other class members in storage at Forrestfield in Perth.

Thirty-four 2300 class locomotives have been overhauled for West Moreton coal traffic as the 2300D class. These locomotives, with larger fuel tanks and a toilet at the end of the long hood now weigh 96 tonnes and are restricted to operation on the coal routes. They include numbers 2301D-2315D, 2320D-2323D, 2330D-2334D, 2336D-2337D, 2339D, 2346D-2348D, 2350D, 2352D, 2359D, 2364D, 2366D and 2388D. The former 1550 class locomotives in this group (2301, 2304-2307, 2309-2315 and 2320-2322) were upgraded with modular (Dash 2) electronics when they were overhauled.

References

External links
Flickr gallery

Aurizon diesel locomotives
Co-Co locomotives
Diesel locomotives of Queensland
Diesel locomotives of Western Australia
Queensland Rail locomotives
Railway locomotives introduced in 1997
Diesel-electric locomotives of Australia
3 ft 6 in gauge locomotives of Australia